Deborah King (born February 9, 1948) is an American author, speaker and attorney. She is the founder and CEO of the Deborah King Center and the author of four books including New York Times best-selling Be Your Own Shaman.

Early life, education and legal career
King graduated from the University of San Francisco with a BA in 1970, and from the University of California Davis with a Juris Doctor in 1973.

King began her legal career at the office of the California Attorney General as a prosecutor in 1973. In 1975, she opened a law firm in South Lake Tahoe, California, specializing in hotel acquisitions and sales. In the 1990s, the firm moved their headquarters to Westlake Village, CA.

Personal development and public speaking career
King opened the Deborah King Center in 2000 in Westlake Village. The Deborah King Center moved from Westlake Village, CA. to the city of Ojai, California, in 2019; the Center focuses on personal development, offers weekly classes, and hosts frequent workshops at the Ojai Valley Inn and Spa  as well as at other locations.

King is a frequent guest on national TV, and has appeared on ABC, NBC, CNN and Fox as well as entertainment shows including Showbiz Tonight, Access Hollywood, and E! Entertainment.  She has a weekly radio show on Hay House Radio.

King’s online courses are published by Mindvalley, the education technology company that focuses on products of personal development, as well as by The Shift Network, a publisher of personal and societal transformative online material.

Writing
King has published four books in the personal development and self-help fields. The first, Truth Heals: What You Hide Can Hurt You, was published on February 15, 2010, and is a United States bestseller.

On April 1, 2011, King's next book, Be Your Own Shaman: Heal Yourself and Others with 21st-Century Energy Medicine, a New York Times bestseller was published. 

King’s most recent book, Heal Yourself – Heal the World, was published by Simon & Schuster on October 10, 2017.

King is also a frequent contributor to Huffington Post and Psychology Today and writes a monthly column for Hay House Publishing.

Publications

(February 15, 2010) 
(April 1, 2011) 
(September 17, 2013) 
(October 10, 2017)

See also

Alternative Medicine
List of people in alternative medicine
Lists of the New York Times Non-Fiction Bestsellers of 2011

References

American lawyers
1958 births
Living people
University of California, Davis alumni